Marián Geňo (born 4 October 1984) is a professional Czech football player who currently plays for FK Baník Sokolov.

Geňo scored a hat-trick on his competitive debut for Sokolov in a first round 2011–12 Czech Cup match against Siad Souš. The game finished 5–0.

References

External links
 
 Profile at FKSokolov.cz

Czech footballers
1984 births
Living people
FK Baník Sokolov players
Association football forwards